The Baqt (or Bakt) (بقط)was a 7th-century CE treaty between the Christian state of Makuria and the new Muslim rulers of Egypt. Lasting almost seven hundred years, it is by some measures the longest-lasting treaty in history. The name comes either from the Egyptian's term for barter, or the Greco-Roman term for pact.

History
Despite its longevity, not much is clear about the baqt and almost all the information about it comes from Muslim sources.

The Baqt was signed after the 652 conquest of Egypt by troops coming from the Arabian peninsula. That year, the Hejazi general Abdallah ibn Abi Sarh led an army south against the Christian kingdoms of Nubia. Later Islamic historians state that Nubia was not worth conquering and the expedition was simply to subordinate the region to Egypt. Earlier sources give the more likely story that the Arab armies met a rare defeat at the Battle of Dongola and only acceded to the Baqt when they realized that the conquest of the region would be difficult. The treaty was negotiated between Abi Sarh and the Makurian King Qalidurut.

Provisions
There is no extant copy of the treaty they signed, and the earliest copies are several centuries after the fact and are quite varied. The treaty might not have been written at all and may have just been an oral agreement. Some sections of the baqt are clear:
the Arabs would not attack Nubia and the Nubians would not attack Egypt
the citizens of the two nations would be allowed to freely trade and travel between the two states and would be guaranteed safe passage while in the other nation
immigration to and settlement in the other nation's lands was forbidden
fugitives were to be extradited, as were escaped slaves
the Nubians were responsible for maintaining a mosque for Muslim visitors and residents
the Muslims had no obligation to protect the Nubians from attacks by third parties
The most important provision was that 360 slaves per year were to be sent to Egypt in exchange for cargoes of wheat and lentils. These slaves had to be of the highest quality, meaning that the elderly and children were excluded. The slaves sent had to be a mix of male and female. In some reports an extra forty were due which were distributed among notables in Egypt.

Sources
Ibn Abd al-Hakam, one of the first historians to discuss the treaty, gives two different versions of the treaty. The first has only Nubia sending slaves north, thus symbolizing its subservience to Egypt. The second version adds an obligation of the Egyptians to also send goods south including wheat and lentils in exchange for the slaves; this would put the two nations on a more equal footing. The second version is more reliable as it conforms with the Nubian version of treaty and further conforms with the results of the first and second Battles of Dongola.

Context and consequences
This treaty was unprecedented in the history of the Arab conquests, being more similar to the arrangements the Eastern Roman Empire sometimes made with its neighbours. It is also unmatched in that it largely blocked the spread of Islam and the Arabs for half a millennium. Spaulding reports that the exchange of goods was a common diplomatic arrangement in Northeast Africa and the Nubians would have had long experience with such agreements.

The Baqt caused some controversy among Islamic theologians as there was disagreement over whether it violated the duty to expand the borders of Islam.

History of Enforcement
The Baqt was not always without controversy and conflicts between the neighbours were not unheard of.

Abbasid period
In the 830s, Egypt plunged into turmoil during the Fourth Fitna and King Zacharias III of Makuria halted payment of the Baqt. When the Abbasid government gained firm control of Egypt, the Abbasids demanded resumption of the Baqt and payment of arrears. Unable or unwilling to pay this large sum Zacharias sent his son and heir Georgios on a long journey to Baghdad in 835 to negotiate directly with the Caliph. This expedition was a great success; the arrears were canceled and the Baqt was altered so that it only had to be paid every three years.

Fatimid period
The closest relations were during the Fatimid period in Egypt. The Shi'ite Fatimids had few allies in the predominantly Sunni Islamic world, and Nubia was an important ally. The slaves sent from Nubia made up the backbone of the Fatimid army.

Ayyubid and Mamluk periods
Relations were worse under the Ayyubids and very poor under the Mamluks, with full-scale war eventually breaking out. Even after Makuria collapsed in the thirteenth century, the Egyptians continued to insist upon its payment by the Muslim successor kingdoms in the region. The Baqt finally ended in the mid-fourteenth century with the complete collapse of organized government in the region.

References
Shinnie, P.L. "Christian Nubia." The Cambridge History of Africa: Volume 2, c. 500 B.C.—A.D. 1050 edited by J.D. Fage. Cambridge: Cambridge University Press, 1978, pp. 556–88. 
Jakobielski, S. 1992. Chapter 8: "Christian Nubia at the Height of its Civilization." UNESCO General History of Africa, Volume III. University of California Press. 

7th-century treaties
Kingdom of Makuria
Medieval Egypt
History of Nubia
7th century in Egypt
Treaties of Egypt